A number of steamships have been named Alaska

 for Pacific Mail Steamship Company

, a steam launch on the National Historic Ships register in the United Kingdom
, an American passenger ship sunk in 1921

, operated 1942–1947 as War Shipping Administration cargo ship/troopship serving Alaska

Ship names

de:Alaska (1881)
ja:アラスカ (客船)